Psychotria cookei is a species of plant in the family Rubiaceae. It is endemic to French Polynesia.

References

Flora of French Polynesia
congesta
Data deficient plants
Taxonomy articles created by Polbot